2-Methyl-3-oxopropanoic acid (or methylmalonate semialdehyde) is an intermediate in the metabolism of thymine and valine.

See also
 Methylmalonate-semialdehyde dehydrogenase (acylating)

References

Aldehydes
Carboxylic acids
Aldehydic acids